Offerings may refer to:

 Offerings (film), a 1989 American slasher film
 Offerings (Typhoon album), 2018
 Offerings: A Worship Album, by Third Day, 2000
 Offerings, a 1998 album by Vas

See also
 Offering (disambiguation)